Afloqualone (Arofuto) is a quinazolinone family GABAergic drug and is an analogue of methaqualone developed in the 1970s by a team at Tanabe Seiyaku. It has sedative and muscle-relaxant effects resulting from its agonist activity at the β subtype of the GABAa receptor and has had some clinical use, although it causes photosensitization as a side-effect that can cause skin problems such as dermatitis.

See also 
 Methaqualone
 Diproqualone
 Etaqualone
 Methylmethaqualone
 Mecloqualone
 Mebroqualone
 Cloroqualone
 Nitromethaqualone

References 

Sedatives
Muscle relaxants
Organofluorides
Quinazolinones
GABAA receptor positive allosteric modulators